Depictions of urine in art include:
 Bad Bad Boy, Helsinki, Finland
 Fideicommissum, Wanås, Sweden
 Fuente de los Niños Miones, Guadalajara, Jalisco, Mexico
 Het Zinneke, Brussels, Belgium
 To Pee in Public or Private Spaces, Various
 Jeanneke Pis, Brussels, Belgium
 Manneken Pis, Brussels, Belgium
 Piss (Černý), Prague, Czech Republic

The sculpture Petra has simulated urine.

Piss Christ is a 1987 photograph by the American artist and photographer Andres Serrano.

See also
 Body fluids in art

Arts-related lists
Urine